The Kragujevac Football Subassociation (Serbo-Croato-Slovenian: Kragujevački loptački podsavez / Крагујевачки лоптачки подсавез) was one of the regional football governing bodies under the tutorial of the Football Association of Yugoslavia.  It was formed on 20 December 1931.

It included initially the clubs from the municipalities of Kragujevac, Kraljevo, Jagodina, which were part of the Belgrade Football Subassociation, and a year later Čačak and Užice, which belonged to Sarajevo Football Subassociation were joined.

The presidents of the Kragujevac Football Subassociation were Bakić (1931 - 1932), Kosta Maršićanin (1932 - 1935) and Zoran Mišić (since 1935, reelected in 1937).

Seasons and champions
These were the seasons and the champions of the Kragujevac FS First League:
1932: Šumadija 1903
1933: Šumadija 1903
1934: Slavija Kragujevac
1935: Radnički Kragujevac
1936: Radnički Kragujevac
1937: Šumadija 1903
1938: Radnički Kragujevac
1939: Radnički Kragujevac
1940: Jedinstvo Čačak

References

Bibliography

Football governing bodies in Serbia
Football governing bodies in Yugoslavia
1931 establishments in Serbia
Sports organizations established in 1931